The Ghipeș is a right tributary of the river Homorodul Mare in Romania. It flows into the Homorodul Mare near Mărtiniș.

References

Rivers of Romania
Rivers of Harghita County